The Gay Senorita is a 1945 American comedy-drama film directed by Arthur Dreifuss, which stars Jinx Falkenburg, Jim Bannon, and Steve Cochran.

Cast list
 Jinx Falkenburg as Elena Sandoval
 Jim Bannon as Phil Frentiss, also known as Phil Dolan
 Steve Cochran as Tomas Obrion, also known as Tim O'Brien
 Corinna Mura as Corinna Mura
 Isabelita as Chiquita
 Thurston Hall as J. J. Frentiss
 Isabel Withers as Kitty
 Marguerita Sylva as Dona Maria Sandoval
 Luisita Triana as Loreto
 Lola Montes as Lola Montez
 Tommy Cook as Paco
 Nina Bara as Lupita
 Leander de Cordova as Padre Anselmo
 Eddie Fields as Pablo
 Antonio Triana as Anastasio

References

External links
 
 
 

Columbia Pictures films
American comedy-drama films
1945 comedy-drama films
1945 films
American black-and-white films
Films directed by Arthur Dreifuss
1940s American films